Kolonowskie  (sometimes Kolonnowska, 1936–1945 Grafenweiler) is a town in Strzelce County, Opole Voivodeship, Poland, with 3,309 inhabitants (2019). It is the seat of Gmina Kolonowskie which has been officially bilingual in Polish and German since 2006.

Demographics
According to the census of 2002, there were 6,582 inhabitants in Gmina Kolonowskie. Of these, 3,370 (51.2%) stated their ethnicity as Polish, 3,203 (48.7%) stated another ethnicity: 2,836 (43.1%) declared German ethnicity and 358 (5.4%) declared Silesian ethnicity.

History
During World War II, Nazi Germans operated the E265 forced labour subcamp of the Stalag VIII-B/344 prisoner-of-war camp in the town, and the E260 and E737 subcamps in the present-day district of Fosowskie.

Twin towns – sister cities
See twin towns of Gmina Kolonowskie.

References

Cities in Silesia
Cities and towns in Opole Voivodeship
Strzelce County